Traveller is an Origins Award winning science fiction role-playing game published by Game Designers' Workshop (GDW) in 1977. It is a time when interstellar travel has become possible and Humaniti has met other starfaring races. Traveller: 2300 portrayed humans as technologically advanced, but having a level of civilization not very far above the present day. Later publishers introduced additional material along the Official Traveller Universe timeline. In 2008, Mongoose Publishing reintroduced GDW's popular look and indexing feature separating publications into familiar Books, Supplements, and Adventures. Far Future Enterprises (FFE), has republished GDW's Traveller publications.

Classic Traveller
There were four editions of the Classic Traveller rules sets: 
Traveller [BOX SET: Books 1-3], by GDW (1977)
Traveller Deluxe Edition [BOX SET: Books 0, 1-3, Adventure 0, map], by GDW (1981)
The Traveller Book [Compiles books 1-3, plus parts of book 0], by GDW (1982)
The Traveller Adventure, by GDW (1983), A companion volume for The Traveller Book
Traveller Starter Edition by Marc W. Miller, GDW (1983)

Books
Basic Traveller comprised three black digest-sized books (1,2,3) that were not sold separately. The subsequent books presented additional rules on specific subjects, expanding on Traveller's basic concepts. They run 48 to 56 pages and require the basic rules sets. In addition to the core books, six more were published. FFE published all nine as a single volume in 2000. With the digest-sized format and color of the books, they became known as little black books.
Book 1-Characters and Combat, by Marc W. Miller (1977)
Book 2-Starships, by Marc W. Miller (1977)
Book 3-Worlds and Adventures, by Marc W. Miller (1977)
Book 4 Mercenary, by Frank Chadwick and Marc Miller (1978)
Book 5 High Guard, by Marc Miller, Frank Chadwick, and John Harshman (1980)
Book 0 An Introduction to Traveller, by Loren K. Wiseman (1981)
Book 6 Scouts, by Marc Miller (1983)
Book 7 Merchant Prince, by Marc W. Miller (1985), 
Book 8 Robots, by Sr. Joe D. Fugate and Timothy B. Brown (1986)
The Classic Books 0-8, FFE (2000)

Supplements
Supplements provide different types of data, including starships, starsystems, characters, and animals in pre-generated form. Thirteen were published, but Supplement 5 Lightning Class Cruisers was only available as part of the Azhanti High Lightning board game. These were in little black book format. FFE published all thirteen as a single volume in 2000.
 
Supplement 1-1001 Characters, by Marc Miller (1978)
Supplement 2-Animal Encounters, by GDW (1979)
Supplement 3-The Spinward Marches, by Marc Miller (1979)
Supplement 4-Citizens of the Imperium, by Marc Miller (1979)
Supplement 5 Lightning Class Cruisers, by GDW (1980)
Supplement 6-76 Patrons, by Loren Wiseman (1980)
Supplement 7-Traders and Gunboats, by Marc Miller (1980)
Supplement 8-Library Data A-M, by Harshman, Miller, Wiseman, and Chadwick (1981)
Supplement 9-Fighting Ships, by Chadwick, Miller, Brown, and Jaquays (1981)
Supplement 10-The Solomani Rim, by John Harshman (1982)
Supplement 11-Library Data N-Z, by John Harshman, Loren Wiseman and Marc Miller (1982)
Supplement 12-Forms and Charts, by Marc Miller (1983)
Supplement 13-Veterans, by Tim Brown (1983)
Classic Traveller: Classic Supplements (2000)

Special Supplements
Short presentations on specific topics, originally appearing in the Journal of the Travellers' Aid Society (JTAS). Four were produced.
Special Supplement 1: Merchant Prince, by J. Andrew Keith, Marc Miller and Loren Wiseman (1982). JTAS #12
Special Supplement 2: Exotic Atmospheres, by J. Andrew Keith (1983). JTAS #17
Special Supplement 3: Missiles in Traveller, by Marc Miller (1984). JTAS #21
Special Supplement 4: The Lost Rules, by Don McKinney (2008).

Adventures
Adventures provided interesting and challenging situations through which more information about the setting would unfold. Fourteen were produced. These were in little black book format. FFE published all foureen as a single volume in 2000. 
Adventure 1-The Kinunir, by Marc Miller (1979)
Adventure 2-Research Station Gamma, by Marc Miller (1980)
Adventure 3-Twilight's Peak, by Marc Miller (1980)
Adventure 4-Leviathan, by Bob McWilliams (1980)
Traveller Adventure 0: Introductory Adventure: The Imperial Fringe, by GDW (1981)
Adventure 5-Trillion Credit Squadron, by Marc Miller and John Harshman (1981)
Adventure 6-Expedition to Zhodane, by Marc Miller (1981)
Adventure 7-Broadsword, by Loren Wiseman (1982)
Adventure 8-Prison Planet, by Eric Wilson and Dave Emigh (1982)
Adventure 9-Nomads of the World Ocean, by J. Andrew Keith and William H. Keith (1983)
Adventure 10-Safari Ship, by Marc Miller (1984)
Adventure 11-Murder on Arcturus Station, by J. Andrew Keith (1983)
Adventure 12-Secret of the Ancients, by Marc Miller (1984)
Adventure 13 Signal GK, by Marc Miller (1985)
Classic Traveller: Classic Adventures (2000)

Double Adventures
These combined two short adventures in a single 48-page book. Eight titles were produced, two in 2001, with one of those only a single adventure. Their tête-bêche format was popularised by the Ace Double sci-fi novels of the 1950s. These were in little black book format. FFE published all eight, plus Special Supplements 1-3, as a single volume in 2001. 
Double Adventure 1 Shadows / Annic Nova, by GDW (1980)
Double Adventure 2 Mission on Mithril/Across the Bright Face, by Marc Miller (1980)
Double Adventure 3 Death Station / Argon Gambit, by Marc Miller and Frank Chadwick (1981)
Double Adventure 4 Marooned / Marooned Alone, by Loren Wiseman (1981)
Double Adventure 5 Chamax Plague / Horde, by J. Andrew Keith and William H. Keith Jr. (1981)
Double Adventure 6 Night of Conquest / Divine Intervention, by Lawrence Schick, William H. Keith Jr. and J. Andrew Keith (1982)
Double Adventure 7 A Plague of Perruques / Stranded on Arden, (2001)
Short Adventure 8 Memory Alpha, (2001)
Double Adventure 1-6+ The Classic Short Adventures, Far Future Enterprises, (2001)

Alien Modules
Each introduced a new alien race to players and referees, complete with character generation, history and background, language material, and an adventure. Eight were produced. FFE published all eight in two volumes volume in 2001. 
Alien Module 1-Aslan, by GDW (1984)
Alien Module 2-K'kree: Encounters with the Enigmatic Centaurs, by J. Andrew Keith and Loren Wiseman (1984)
Alien Module 3-Vargr, by J. Andrew Keith and Marc Miller (1984)
Alien Module 4-Zhodani, by J. Andrew Keith and Marc Miller (1985)
Traveller Alien Module 5 Droyne, by J. Andrew Keith and Marc Miller (1985)
Alien Module 6-Solomani, by Marc Miller and William H. Keith Jr. (1986)
Alien Module 7-Hivers, by J. Andrew Keith, Marc W. Miller and Loren K. Wiseman (1986)
Alien Module 8-Darrians, by Marc W. Miller (1987)
The Alien Modules 1-4 FFE (2001)
The Alien Modules 5-8 FFE (2001)

Modules
Modules provided larger adventures and additional materials. Five were produced.
M01 Tarsus: World Beyond the Frontier Take a SF Odyssey to Tarsus, [Box set: rules booklet, World Map of Tarsus, Subsector map of District 268, Detail Map of Tanglewald, Twelve character cards, 2 source books ], by GDW (1983) Marc Miller & loren K. Wismen
M02 BeltStrike: Riches and Danger in the Bowman Belt [Box set], by J. Andrew Keith and John Harshman (1984)
M03 The Spinward Marches Campaign: Adventures in a War-Ravaged Sector, by Marc Miller (1985)
M04 Atlas of the Imperium, by GDW (1984)
M05 Alien Realms (1986)

Boardgames
GDW was a boardgame publisher long before it published Traveller, and as a result it published eight Traveller boardgames. FFE published all eight as a single volume in 2000.
G0 Imperium [BOX SET: Rules booklet, 2 combat charts, terran/imperial counters, board/map], by Marc Miller, Frank Chadwick and John Harshman (1977)
G2 Snapshot-Close Combat Aboard Starships in the Far Future [BOX SET: Rules Booklet, Map, Dice Modifier Sheet, counters], by Marc Miller, Paul R. Banner and Frank Chadwick (1979)
G3 Azhanti High Lightning-Close Combat Aboard Starships in the Far Future [BOX SET: Rules Booklet, Supplement 5, 14 maps, Dice Modifier Sheet, counters], by Frank Chadwick and Marc Miller (1980)
G6 Dark Nebula [BOX SET: rules, 8 maps, counters], by Marc Miller (1980)
G1 Mayday [BOX SET: Rules booklet, 4 maps, counters] (1980)
G4 Fifth Frontier War: Battles for the Spinward Marches [BOX SET: rules, maps, charts, 3 counter sheets] by Marc Miller, Frank Chadwick, John M. Astell and Paul R. Banner (1981)
G5 Invasion: Earth The Final Battle of the Solomani Rim War [BOX SET: rules booklet, 480 die-cut counters, map, and charts], by Marc Miller, Frank Chadwick and John Astell (1981)
G7 Striker : Rules for 15mm Traveller Miniatures [BOX SET: rules booklet 1, 2, 3, sequence tables, useful tables 1 & 2] by Marc Miller, Frank Chadwick and John Harshman (1981)
The Classic Games 1-6+ FFE (2004)

Specials
GDW produced a variety of support materials of Traveller.
 Understanding Traveller [Short overview booklet], by GDW (1981)

Fanzines
 Alien Star (1981)

Traveller: 2300 (2nd edition renamed to 2300 AD)
Traveller: 2300 (version 1.0) [BOX SET: Player's manual, Referee's manual, Near Star List, The Tricolor's Shadow, forms], by Marc Miller, Tim Brown, Lester Smith, and Frank Chadwick (1987) GDW
2300 AD (Traveller: 2300, version 2.0) [BOX SET: Adventurer's Guide, Director's Guide, Near Star Map, Playaids], by Marc Miller, Tim Brown, Lester Smith, and Frank Chadwick (1988) GDW
Star Cruiser [BOX SET: Naval Architect's Manual, Data Form Booklet, Rule and Scenario Booklet, 2 maps, Counter sheet (180 counters), 2 Combat charts], by Frank Chadwick
Sourcebooks
 Aurore Sourcebook [1010] (K)
 Colonial Atlas
 Earth/Cybertech Sourcebook [1015] (E)
 Equipment Guide
 Ground Vehicle  [1036]
 Invasion (K)
 Kafer Sourcebook (K)
 Nyotekundu Sourcebook [1012]
 Ships of the French Arm [1011]
Adventures
 Bayern [1035]
 Beanstalk [1030]
 Deathwatch Program [1016] (E)
 Energy Curve [1031]
 Kafer Dawn [1032] (K)
 Mission Arcturus [1033] (K)
 Ranger [1038]
 Rotten to the Core [1017] (E)
(E)-Earth (cyberpunk subgenre)
(K)-Kafer War

MegaTraveller
Megatraveller [BOX SET: Player's Manual [0211], Referee's Manual [0212], Imperial Encyclopedia [0213], Map of Spinward Marches], by GDW (1987)
Referee's Companion [0215] (1987)
Rebellion Source Book [0214] (1988)
COACC [0216] (1989)
Fighting Ships of the Shattered imperium [0218] (1990) 
Knightfall [0219] (1990)
Hard Times [0221] (1991)
Assignment Vigilante [0223] (1992)
Astrogators' Guide to the Diaspora Sector [0224] (1992)
Arrival Vengeance [0225] (1992)

Digest Group Publications
Grand Census (1987)
Grand Survey (1987)
101 Robots (1987)
101 Vehicles (1988)
The Early Adventures (1988)
Starship Operator's Manual (1988)
Referee's Gaming Kit (1989)
World Builders' Handbook (1989)
Alien - Vilani & Vargr (1990)
The Flaming Eye Campaign Sourcebook (1990)
Alien - Solomani & Aslan (1991)

Traveller: The New Era
Traveller: The New Era Core Rules, by GDW (1993)
TNE Deluxe, [BOX SET: Rulebook; Fire Fusion & Steel, upgrade booklet, green player cards, map subsector data cards], by GDW (1993)
Upgrade Booklet for Fire, Fusion, and Steel [0302/E1]
Battle Rider [0308] (1993)
Brilliant Lances [0303] (1993)
Fire, Fusion, & Steel [0304] (1993)
Survival Margin [0301] (1993)
Path of Tears [0309] (1994)
Reformation Coalition Equipment Guide [0310] (1994)
Star Vikings [0315] (1994)
Striker II [0313] (1994)
Smash & Grab [0305] (1994)
Traveller Players' Forms [0306] (1994 TBC)
Traveller Referee's Screen [0307] (1994 TBC)
World Tamer's Handbook [0311] (1994)
Aliens of the Rim: Hivers and Ithklur [0318] (1995)
The Guilded Lilly [0330] (1995)
Regency Combat Vehicle Guide [0320] (1995)
The Regency Sourcebook: Keepers of the Flame [0314] (1995)
Vampire Fleets [0312] (1995)

T4: Marc Miller's Traveller
Marc Miller's Traveller: 4th ed., Imperium Games, Inc. (1996)
Alien's Archive (1996)
Central Supply Catalog (1996)
Fire, Fusion, & Steel (1996)
Game Screen (1996)
JTAS25 (1996)
Milieu 0-Memory Alpha (1996)
Milieu 0-Campaign (1996)
T4 Starships (1996)
Adventure 1: Long Way Home (1997)
Adventure 2: Gateway! (1997)
Adventure 3: Annililik Run (1997)
Anomalies (1997)
Emperors Arsenal (1997)
Emperors Vehicles (1997)
Imperial Squadrons (1997)
JTAS26 (1997)
Naval Architect's Manual (1997)
Pocket Empires (1997)
Psionics Institutes (1997)
T4 First Survey (1997)
Gateway to the Stars (1998)
Missions of State (1998)

GURPS Traveller
GURPS Traveller, by Loren Wiseman (1998) Steve Jackson Games
Alien Races 1 (1998)
Behind the Claw (1998)
Alien Races 2 (1999)
Far Trader (1999)
First In (1999)
GURPS Traveller, 2nd ed., by Loren Wiseman (1999)
Star Mercs (1999)
Starports (1999)
Alien Races 3 (2000)
Deck Plan 1-Beowulf Class Far Trader (2000)
Ground Forces (2000)
Planetary Survey 1-Kamsii (2000)
Rim of Fire (2000)
Alien Races 4 (2001)
Planetary Survey 2-Denuli (2001)
Deck Plan 2-Modular Cutter (2002)
Deck Plan 3-Empress Marava Class Far Trader (2002)
Deck Plan 4-Assault Cutter (2002)
Deck Plan 5-Sulieman-Class Scout/Courier (2002)
Deck Plan 6-Dragon Class System Defense Boat (2002)
GM's Screen (2002)
Heroes 1: Bounty Hunters (2002)
Planetary Survey 3-Granicus (2002)
Planetary Survey 4-Glisten (2002)
Planetary Survey 5-Tobibak (2002)
Planetary Survey 6-Darkmoon (2002)
Heroes 2: Fighter Jocks (2003)
Humanati (2003)
Starships (2003)
Modular Cutter (2004)
Nobles (2004)
Sword Worlds (2004)
Interstellar Wars (2006)
Droyne Coyn Set TBC

Traveller20
The Traveller's Handbook, by QLI/RPGRealms Publishing (2002)s
T20 Lite
Traveller d20 Referee's Screen
Gateway to Destiny (2004)
Personal Weapons of Charted Space
Yiarn Caardee Vehicle Catalog (2004)
Traveller's Guidebook

Downloadable products
2320 AD (PDF), by QuikLink Interactive (2007)
2340 AD TBC
Traveller Guidebook
Personal Weapons of Charted Space (Traveller's Aide #1)
Grand Endeavor (Traveller's Aide #2)
On the Ground (Traveller's Aide #3)
76 Gunmen (Traveller's Aide #4)
Objects of the Mind (Traveller's Aide #5)
Against Gravity (Traveller's Aide #6)
Fighting Ships (Traveller's Aide #7)
Through the Waves (Traveller's Aide #8)
Fighting Ships of the Solomani (Traveller's Aide #9)
Stoner Express (EPIC Adventure #1)
Into the Glimmer Drift (EPIC Adventure #2)
Chimera (EPIC Adventure #3)
Merchant Cruiser (EPIC Adventure #4)
Scout Cruiser (EPIC Adventure #5)
Mercenary Cruiser (EPIC Adventure #6)
Merc Heaven (EPIC Adventure #7)
The Forgotten War (Golden Age Adventure #1)
The Gabriel Enigma (Golden Age Adventure #2)
The Sydymic Outworlds Cluster (Special Supplement #1)
The Mahkahraik (Free Download)
Revelation Station (Scenes of Adventure #1)

Traveller Hero
Book 1: Adventurers in Charted Space: Character Creation, Psionics, Combat and Races, Rob Bruce, Kevin Walsh and Randy Hollingsworth (2007) Comstar Gamess
Book 2: Adventure in Charted Space: The Imperium, Gadgets, Vehicles, Robots and Starships (2007)
Golden Age Starships 1: Fast Courier
Golden Age Starships 2: SW Patrol cruiser
Golden Age Starships 3: Archaic Small Craft
Golden Age Starships 4: Boats and Pinnaces
Golden Age Starships 5: Cutters and Shuttles
Golden Age Starships 6: Corsair
Golden Age Starships 7: Modular Starship
Golden Age Starships 8: Armed Free Trader

Mongoose Traveller
Mongoose Traveller Core Rulebook, by Gareth Hanrahan (2008)s
Character Record Pack, by Matthew Sprange and Richard Ford (2009)
Golden Age Starships Compilation, by Simon Beal and Martin J. Dougherty (2009)
Traveller Core Rulebook Pocket Edition, by Gareth Hanrahan (2009)
Referee's Screen, by Mongoose Publishing (2009)
Compendium 1, by Mongoose Publishing (2010)
Compendium 2, by Mongoose Publishing (2012)

Books
Traveller Book 0: An Introduction to Traveller by Gareth Hanrahan  (2008), MGP3808
Book 1 Mercenary (2008)
Book 1 Mercenary Second Edition
Book 2 High Guard, by Gareth Hanrahan (2008)
Book 3 Scout, by Lawrence Whitaker, (2009). 
Book 4 Psion, by Gareth Hanrahan (2009)
Book 5 Agent, by Gareth Hanrahan (2009)
Book 6 Scoundrel, by Gareth Hanrahan (2009)
Book 7 Merchant Prince, by Bryan Steele (2010)
Book 8 Dilettante, by Pete Nash (2010)
Book 9 Robot, by Uri Kurlianchik (2010)
Book 10 Cosmopolite, by Alex Greene (2014)

Little Black Books (LBB)
LBB 1-Mercenary (2010)
LBB 2-High Guard, by Mongoose Publishing (2010)
LBB 3-Scout, by Mongoose Publishing (2010)
LBB 4-Psion, by Mongoose Publishing (2010)
LBB 5-Agent, by Mongoose Publishing (2010)
LBB 6-Scoundrel, by Mongoose Publishing (2010)
LBB 7-Merchant Prince, by Mongoose Publishing (2010)
LBB 8-Dilettante, by Mongoose Publishing (2010)
LBB 9-Library Data, by Mongoose Publishing (2010)
Supplements
Supplement 1-760 Patrons, by Mongoose Publishing (2008)
Supplement 2-Traders and Gunboats, by Bryan Steele (2008)
Supplement 3-Fighting Ships, by Bryan Steele and Stuart Machin (2009)
Supplement 4-Central Supply Catalog, by Martin J. Dougherty and Bryan Steele (2009)
Supplement 5-Civilian Vehicles, by Simon Beal and Martin J. Dougherty (2009)
Supplement 6-Military Vehicles, by Simon Beal and Martin J. Dougherty (2009)
Supplement 7-1001 Characters, by August Hahn (2010)
Supplement 8-Cybernetics, by Lawrence Whitaker (2011)
Supplement 9-Campaign Guide, by August Hahn (2011)
Supplement 10-Merchants and Cruisers (2011)
Supplement 11-Animal Encounters, by August Hahn (2011)
Supplement 12-Dynasty, by Mongoose Publishing (2011)
Supplement 5 & 6-The Vehicle Handbook, by Colin Dunn, Matthew Sprange, Nick Robinson and Jonathan Goodyear (2012)
Supplement 13: Starport Encounters 
Supplement 14: Space Stations 
Supplement 15: Powers and Principalities 
Supplement 16: Adventure Seeds
Adventures
Adventure 1-Beltstrike, by Lawrence Whittaker (2009)
Adventure 2-Prison Planet, Garth Hanrahan (2009)
Adventure 3 - Trillion Credit Squadron
Adventure 4 - Into The Unknown
Third Imperium
Spinward Marches, by Martin J Dougherty (2008)
Alien Module 1: Aslan, by Gareth Hanrahan (2009)
Alien Module 2: Vargr, by Simon Beal (2009)
Tripwire, by Simon Beal (2009)
Alien Module 3: Darrians, by Pete Nash 2010 
Crowded Hours, by Mongoose Publishing (2010)
Reft Sector, by Martin J. Dougherty (2010)
Reign of Discordia, by Darrin Drader (2010)
Sector Fleet by Mongoose Publishing (2010)
Starports, by Mongoose Publishing (2011)
Alien Module 4: Zhodani, by Don McKinney (2011)
Alien Module 5: Solomani, by David Pulver (2012)
Aramis: The Traveller Adventure, by Marc Miller (2012)
Deneb Sector, by Rob Eaglestone (2012)
Sword Worlds, by Bryan Steele (2012)
Alien Module 6: Droyne
Armageddon 2089
Campaign 1: Secrets of the Ancients
Minor Alien Module 1: Luriani
Project Steel
The Spinward Marches Map Pack
The Trojan Reaches Map Pack
The Gvurrdon Map Pack
Traveller 2300
Traveller: 2300AD, by Colin Dunn (2012)
French Arm Adventures (2013)
Tools for Frontier Living (2013)
Ships of the French Arm 
The Grendelssaga 
Bayern (tbc)
Atlas of the French Arm (tbc)

Traveller5
Traveller5 Core Rulebook by Marc Miller, Far Future Enterprises (2013)

Books by third party publishers

FASA

Adventures
Action Aboard: Adventures on the King Richard
Fate of the Sky Raiders
The Legend of the Sky Raiders
Ordeal by Eshaar
Rescue on Galatea
The Trail of the Sky Raiders
Uragyad'n of the Seven Pillars

Supplements
Adventure Class Ships, Vol. I
Adventure Class Ships, Vol. II
Aslan Mercenary Ships
Far Traveller
The FCI Consumer Guide
High Passage
I.S.C.V.: King Richard
I.S.C.V.: Leander
I.S.P.M.V.: Fenris / S.F.V. Valkyrie
I.S.P.M.V.: Tethys
Merchant Class Ships
ZISMV: Vlezhdatl

Gamelords

Adventures
Ascent To Anekthor
The Drenslaar Quest
Duneraiders

Supplements
The Desert Environment
Lee's Guide to Interstellar Adventure
The Mountain Environment
A Pilot's Guide to the Drexilthar Subsector
Startown Liberty
The Undersea Environment
Wanted: Adventurers

Games Workshop
 IISS Ship Files (1981)
 Starship Lay-Out Sheets (1981)
 Traveller Personal Data Files (1981)

Group One

Adventures
Geptorem
Hydronaut
Mission to Zephor
Nithus
Nystalux
Port Xanatath

Supplements
Encounters in the Corelian Quadrant
Encounters in the Phoenix Quadrant
Encounters in the Ventura Quadrant
Lomodo IVa
Marinagua!
Sapies
Theta Borealis Sector

Judges Guild

Adventures
Amycus Probe
Corsairs of the Turku Waste
Darkling Ship
Darthanon Queen
Dra'k'ne Station
Marooned on Ghostring
Rogue Moon of Spinstorme
Simba Safari
Tancred

Supplements
The Astrogators Chartbook
Crucis Margin
Fifty Starbases
Glimmerdrift Reaches
Ley Sector (1980)
Maranantha-Alkahest Sector (1981)
Navigator's Starcharts
Starships & Spacecraft(1979)
The Traveller Logbook (1979)
Traveller Referee Screens (1978)
Waspwinter

Marischal Adventures
Fleetwatch
Flight of the Stag
Salvage Mission
Trading Team

Paranoia Press
Beyond
Merchants & Merchandise
Scouts & Assassins
SORAG
Traveller Record Sheets
Vanguard Reaches

See also 
Traveller (role-playing game)
J. Andrew Keith
Joe Fugate
Gary L. Thomas
Marc William Miller
Frank Chadwick
John Harshman
Loren Wiseman
Gareth Hanrahan

References 

 
Traveller
Traveller